James Makin (11 February 1904 – 15 January 1973) was an Australian cricketer. He played five first-class cricket matches for Victoria between 1927 and 1930.

See also
 List of Victoria first-class cricketers

References

External links
 

1904 births
1973 deaths
Australian cricketers
Victoria cricketers
Cricketers from Melbourne